The Uganda National Liberation Front (UNLF) was a political group formed by exiled Ugandans opposed to the rule of Idi Amin with an accompanying military wing, the Uganda National Liberation Army (UNLA). UNLA fought alongside Tanzanian forces in the Uganda–Tanzania War that led to the overthrow of Idi Amin's regime. The group ruled Uganda from the overthrow of Amin in April 1979 until the disputed national elections in December 1980.

Creation 
The UNLF was formed as an outcome of a meeting of Ugandan exiles from 24 to 26 March 1979 in the northern Tanzanian town of Moshi. In the meeting, known as the Moshi Conference, 28 groups were represented. The most important groups that united to form UNLA included Kikosi Maalum led by Milton Obote (with Tito Okello and David Oyite Ojok as commanders); FRONASA led by Yoweri Museveni; and the Save Uganda Movement.

Governance 
UNLF was governed by an 11-member Executive Council originally chaired by Yusuf Lule who also held the position of President of Uganda at that Time, with Vice Chairman being Akena P' Ojok, who also held the position of Vice President of Uganda at that time. The UNLF was accompanied by a National Consultative Council (NCC) with one member for each of the 28 groups represented at the meeting. Its military arm, UNLA, fought side by side with the Tanzania People's Defence Force (TPDF) in the Uganda-Tanzania War and invaded Uganda, taking Kampala in April 1979 and sending Amin to exile. There were other party members of UNLF across the country and in the regions formed to coordinate the activities of UNLF.

Overthrowing of Idi Amin 
Following the overthrow of Amin on 11 April 1979, a new UNLF government was formed under Yusuf Lule with the UNLA becoming the new national army. The leadership of the UNLF was unstable, with infighting leading to the ousting of Lule in June 1979. His replacement, Godfrey Binaisa, ruled for less than twelve months before being placed under house arrest in May 1980 following an effective coup by Paulo Muwanga. A Presidential Commission was installed with elections planned for December 1980. The exiles who formed the UNLF needed to put aside their political differences to do so. They were only united by one thing: an opposition to Amin. For this reason, the UNLF did not contest the elections with its members supporting various parties.

Following a widely disputed victory for the Uganda People's Congress (UPC) led by former president Milton Obote, many of the UNLF founding members would go on to fight against the now UPC-controlled UNLA. The UNLA was defeated on January 25, 1986 by the guerrillas of the National Resistance Army (NRA) led by Yoweri Museveni, a former member of the UNLF executive council and a minister in the UNLF government. There was a tribal conflict between the Acholi and Langi, that led to the coup d'état making Tito Okello Lutwa president of the republic.

References

Works cited 

 
 
 
 

Defunct political parties in Uganda
Military of Uganda
Political parties established in 1979
Rebel groups in Uganda
Resistance movements